Aprophata nigrescens is a species of beetle in the family Cerambycidae. It was described by Stephan von Breuning in 1973. It is known from the Philippines.

References

Pteropliini
Beetles described in 1973